Mantachie is a town in Itawamba County, Mississippi, United States. The population was 1,121 in the 2020 census.

The town began as a crossroads store owned and operated by Woods Pearce. Near Mantachie on the old Jacinto Road was the largest Chickasaw village in this section of the state. Mantachie was named for one of the Chickasaw chiefs, Man-ta-chee. Most of the Chickasaws left the village after the Treaty of Pontotoc Creek was signed in 1832.

Geography
Mantachie Creek, a south-flowing tributary of the Tombigbee River, runs past the west side of the town.

Demographics

2020 census

As of the 2020 United States census, there were 1,121 people, 652 households, and 345 families residing in the town.

2010 census
As of the census of 2010, there were 1,144 people, 511 households, and 319 families residing in the town. The racial makeup of the town was 96.6% White, 2.2% African American, 0.2% Native American, 0.2% Asian, 0.0 from other races, and 0.06% from two or more races. Hispanic or Latino of any race were 0.4% of the population.

There were 321 households, out of which 27.2% had children under the age of 18 living with them, 45.4% were married couples living together, 13.1% had a female householder with no husband present, and 37.2% were non-families. 25.9% of all households were made up of individuals which were 31.1% under 18 and 12.7% 65 years of age or older. The average household size was 2.85 and the average family size was 2.98.

In the town, the population was spread out, with 24.5% under the age of 18, 23.9% from 18 to 24, 28.5% from 25 to 44, 26.6% from 45 to 64, and 18.6% who were 65 years of age or older. The median age was 40.8 years. Male Population: 536 (46.9%) Female Population: 608 (53.1%)
 
The median income for a household in the town was $41,994, and the median income for a family was $50,046. about 11.6% of families and 9.2% of the population were below the poverty line

Education
Mantachie is served by the Itawamba County School District. Mantachie Elementary School serves grades K-6, Mantachie Junior High serves grades 7 and 8, and Mantachie High School serves grades 9-12. The Mantachie Schools are rated as "B" schools by the Mississippi Department of Education.

The Mantachie Schools' nickname is the mustang. Its logo is similar to that of the SMU mascot. The school colors are royal blue and gold. The Mustangs field athletic teams in football, cross country, slow pitch and fast pitch softball, basketball, baseball, track, bowling, and archery (the last of which has won state championships from 2014–17).

Notable people
 Randy Boyd, member of the Mississippi House of Representatives
 Jerry Wilburn, member of the Mississippi House of Representatives from 1964 to 1980

References

External links
Town of Mantachie official website

Towns in Mississippi
Towns in Itawamba County, Mississippi
Towns in Tupelo micropolitan area